Sainte-Anne-de-Prescott (often written as Ste-Anne-de-Prescott) is a predominantly francophone, town in the United Counties of Prescott and Russell, near the Québec border and Glengarry County, in Ontario Canada. It is a part of and the seat of the Municipality of East Hawkesbury.

Geography 
Sainte-Anne-de-Prescott is a village in eastern Ontario and near the Québec border. Nearby locations include Saint-Eugene and Sainte-Justine-de-Newton which is in the Regional County Municipality of Vaudreuil-Soulanges.

Urbanism

Church 
The construction of the church began on August 9, 1883 in order to celebrate the first mass in the sacristy on January 13, 1884. The bell was acquired from the Ernest Chanteloup Company that same year. The church was blessed by Bishop Duhamel September 4, 1884 and the first resident pastor, Joseph E. Coderre, arrived on June 9, 1885. In 1897, the construction of the transepts were completed, and the church acquired a Casavant Frères (opus 85). In 1914 the interior was greatly enhanced through the paintings, executives and faux marble columns made by the painter Toussaint-Xénophon Renaud. In 1921, the cemetery was embellished with an angel of the resurrection of Louis Jobin. The interior restorations of 1958 and 2002 refreshed the colours of the church but several decorative elements were lost. The church has a painting by Toussaint-Xénophon Renaud representing the death of St. Joseph, which was restored in 2013.

Village components 
 Roman Catholic Church
 United Church of Canada
 Action centre
 Park with baseball field, tennis and beach volleyball as well as slides and swings 
 Convenience store
 Dairy and horse farms
 Organic farms
 Sugar shacks
 Camping Titley
 beekeeping
 Excavator, truckers, mechanics

Stations of the cross 
Ste-Anne-de-Prescott is one of the few villages in Ontario that have retained many of its stations of the cross.

History 
In the early nineteenth century, the area was occupied by a handful of settlers, mostly British. In 1847 the diocese of Bytown (Ottawa) founded a settlement company that promotes immigration in eastern Ontario to combat the exodus of Canadians to the United States and to ensure the Catholic presence in Ontario. The parish received its official title in 1885. The reason for the choice of St. Anne as patron remains unknown but Prescott comes from the name given to the county. Prescott County is named for Robert Prescott (1726-1815), a distinguished soldier who was Governor-in-Chief of the Canadas from 1796-1799.

Economy 
There are some 70 companies in Sainte-Anne-de-Prescott. The local economy is based on agriculture.

Society 
This community of about 500 residents is enterprising and committed.  Through the work of its volunteers, Sainte-Anne-de-Prescott organizes community and sports activities every year.  In addition, it is home to various regional and interprovincial activities such as the Ancient Day, the pilgrimage to Sainte-Anne (since 2002), and the "Gala Folklorique", to name but a few.  Sainte-Anne-de-Prescott celebrated its 125th anniversary in 2010.  Some organizations:

 Golden age club
 Action Centre Committee
 Recreation Committee
 Farmers' Circle
 Knights of Columbus
 Snowmobile Club
 Club 4-H
 Economic Development Committee
 Committee of the parish of Sainte-Anne-de-Prescott

See also 

 East Hawkesbury

References

Bibliography 
 Cécile Desroches-Leroux. 100 years of history, 100 years of life, 100 years of faith.  Sainte-Anne-de-Prescott: Catholic Parish of Sainte-Anne-de-Prescott, 1985. - 196 p.  - 
 Shena Lavigne. A church, a monument, a marvel.  - Sainte-Anne-de-Prescott: Catholic Parish of Sainte-Anne-de-Prescott, 2004. - 75 p.  
 Giovanni Princigalli, before or after Sainte-Anne, a documentary on the St. Anne Feast shot in 2010 at St. Anne Prescott and Montreal.

External links 
 Site of the Municipality of East Hawkesbury
 Site of the village

Communities in the United Counties of Prescott and Russell